Céüse is a limestone mountain in the Hautes-Alpes département of France near Gap and Sigoyer. The mountain has a distinctive large horseshoe-shaped cliff (the Corniche de Céûse) which contains some of the most extreme sport climbing routes in the world. It is also the site of a ski resort.

Naming

Geology
The mountain is an example of a perched syncline, which presents as a south-facing horseshoe-shaped limestone cliff.

Ski resort

Climbing
The southern end of the mountain's long horseshoe-shaped limestone cliffs, the Corniche de Céûse, is the home to one of the world's best rock climbing crags, including several notable extreme sport climbing routes such as Realization/Biographie , and Bibliographie .  

Its south-facing cliffs have a distinctive blue and ochre colouring, and the climbing is via pocket-marks in the limestone rather than via cracks. Most of the climbs are single-pitch 25 to 40-metre climbs, with long-run outs often between bolts, however, there are also 200-metre sections with multi-pitch routes.

See also

Buoux, leading limestone rock climbing crag in France
Verdon Gorge, leading limestone rock climbing crag in France

References

Further reading

External links
Ceuse Sport Climbing Guide

Mountains of Hautes-Alpes
Two-thousanders of France
Climbing areas of France